Grzegorz is a Polish given name, equivalent to English Gregory. Its diminutive forms include Grześ, Grzesiek, and Grzesio; augmentative – Grzechu.

Individuals named Grzegorz may choose to celebrate their name day on 2, 4 and 10 January; 11 and 13 March; 24 and 26 April; 4, 9, 25 May; 13 June; 25 August; 3 and 30 September; 17, 20, 23, and 28 November and 10, 19 and 24 December.

People with the first name Grzegorz 
Grzegorz Cebula (born 1981), DJ and record producer
Grzegorz Ciechowski (1957–2001), rock singer and film score composer
Grzegorz Fitelberg (1879–1953), conductor, violinist and composer
Grzegorz Gajewski (born 1985), chess grandmaster
Grzegorz Gawlik (born 1980), traveler and mountaineer
Grzegorz Hajdarowicz (born 1965), entrepreneur, film producer and publisher
Grzegorz Halama (born 1970), parodist and cabaret actor
Grzegorz Hyży (born 1987), singer-songwriter
Grzegorz Kacała (born 15 1966), rugby player
Grzegorz Karnas (born in 1972), jazz vocalist, music producer, linguist and photographer
Grzegorz Kaźmierczak (born 1964), poet, singer and record producer
Grzegorz Kosok (born 1986), volleyball player
Grzegorz Krychowiak (born 1990), football player
Grzegorz Lato (born 1950), football player
Grzegorz Łomacz (born 1987), volleyball player
Grzegorz Małecki (born 1967), diplomat and senior official
Grzegorz Miecugow (1955–2017), journalist and television personality
Grzegorz Napieralski (born 1974), politician
Grzegorz Nowak (born 1951), conductor
Grzegorz Pojmański (born 1959), astronomer
Grzegorz Przemyk (1964–1983), poet
Grzegorz Rasiak (born 1979), football player
Grzegorz Rosiński (born 1941), comic book artist
Grzegorz Schetyna (born 1963), politician
Grzegorz Stec (born 1955), painter, graphic artist and poet
Grzegorz Turnau (born 1967), composer, pianist, poet and singer
Grzegorz Wagner (born 1965), volleyball player and coach
Grzegorz Walasek (born 1976), speedway rider 
Grzegorz Wrochna (born 1962), physicist

See also 

 Polish name

Polish masculine given names